A flexplate (or flex plate) is a metal disk that connects the output from an engine to the input of a torque converter in a car equipped with an automatic transmission. It takes the place of the flywheel found in a conventional manual transmission setup. The name refers to the ability of the disk to flex across its main axis bending side to side to take up motion in the torque converter as rotational speeds change. Flexplates are generally much thinner and lighter than flywheels due to the smooth coupling action of the torque converter and the elimination of the clutch surface. Like flywheels, flexplates normally handle coupling to the starter motor, via teeth cut along the outer edge of the plate. These teeth give the flexplate a gear-like appearance, in spite of this being a secondary function. Flexplates come in many forms, but are usually either stamped steel (common on road cars), a two-piece billet (common on race cars) or a one-piece billet (common high-performance drag racers).

See also
 Flywheel

References

 "South African Automotive Light Vehicle"

Automobile transmissions